Henry Wilson (3 May 1897–unknown) was an English footballer who played in the Football League for Blackpool and South Shields.

References

1897 births
English footballers
Association football midfielders
English Football League players
Gateshead A.F.C. players
Blackpool F.C. players
Aldershot F.C. players
Year of death missing